Sindphana Dam, is an earthfill dam on Sindphana river near Shirur Kasar, Beed district in the state of Maharashtra in India.

Specifications

Purpose
 Irrigation
 Farming 
 Tourism Purpose
 Mr. Abhimanyu Kalyan Mahadik, Mobile 9730229595

See also
 Dams in Maharashtra
 List of reservoirs and dams in India

References

Dams in Beed district
Dams completed in 1963
1963 establishments in Maharashtra